Eutherini is a tribe of flies in the family Tachinidae.

Genera
Euthera Loew, 1854
Redtenbacheria Schiner, 1861

References

Diptera of Europe
Diptera of Australasia
Diptera of Asia
Diptera of North America
Dexiinae
Brachycera tribes